The Australasian Performing Right Association Awards of 2002 (generally known as APRA Awards) are a series of awards which include the APRA Music Awards, Classical Music Awards, and Screen Music Awards. The APRA Music Awards  were presented by APRA and the Australasian Mechanical Copyright Owners Society (AMCOS). The Classical Music Awards were distributed in July in Sydney. The Screen Music Awards were issued in November by APRA and Australian Guild of Screen Composers (AGSC). AGSC had provided their own awards ceremonies, from 1996 to 2000, with categories for film and TV composers: many were similar to the Screen Music Awards.

Awards
Nominees and winners with results indicated on the right.

See also
Music of Australia

References

External links
APRA official website
APRA Awards - History

2002 in Australian music
2002 music awards
APRA Awards